On 1 May 2016, attacks targeted Iraq's deep Shiite south, with the explosion of twin suicide car bombs in the city of Samawa. At least 33 people were killed and 75 wounded.

Bombing
The first blast took place near a local government building and the second one about 65 yards away at a bus station, police sources said. The death toll and wounded number is expected to keep rising. The blasts took place in Samawa, in southern Iraq. The Islamic State of Iraq and the Levant claimed responsibility for the attacks in Iraq's deep Shiite south, where incidents are considered rare. The bombers were named as Abu Dayyar al-Qurashi and Abu Zubayr al-Zaidi.

See also
 2015–16 Iraqi protests
 List of terrorist incidents, January–June 2016
 Terrorist incidents in Iraq in 2016
 Timeline of the Iraq War (2016)

References

2016 murders in Iraq
21st-century mass murder in Iraq
Attacks on Shiite mosques
Explosions in 2016
ISIL terrorist incidents in Iraq
Mass murder in 2016
Mass murder in Iraq
Suicide bombings in Iraq
Terrorist incidents in Iraq in 2016
Islamic terrorist incidents in 2016
May 2016 crimes in Asia
May 2016 events in Iraq
Mosque bombings by Islamists
Attacks on religious buildings and structures in Iraq
Building bombings in Iraq